Father of the Year is a 2018 American comedy film directed by Tyler Spindel. The film stars David Spade, Nat Faxon, Bridgit Mendler, Joey Bragg, Matt Shively, and Jared Sandler.

The film was released on July 20, 2018 by Netflix. It was panned by critics.

Plot
When a debate between two college graduates about whose father would win in a fight is taken seriously by their dads, jobs are lost, relationships ruined, and best friends come of age as they come to grips with the identity of their fathers.

Cast
 David Spade as Wayne, Ben's dimwitted unemployed father
 Nat Faxon as Mardy, Larry's scientist father
 Joey Bragg as Ben, Wayne's son who is a recent college graduate and Larry's best friend
 Matt Shively as Larry, Mardy's son and Ben's best friend
 Bridgit Mendler as Meredith, Ben's love interest
 Jackie Sandler as Krystal, Mardy's wife, Larry's stepmother, and Aiden's mother
 Mary Gillis as Ruth Franklin, Larry's neighbor
 Jared Sandler as Nathan, Ben's and Larry's friend
 Bill Kottkamp as PJ, Ben's and Larry's friend
 Camille Clark as Caryssa, the hot townie
 Kevin Nealon as Peter Francis, CEO of ISG Energy
 Peyton Russ as Aiden, Krystal's son, Mardy's stepson, and Larry's stepbrother
 Moses Storm as Trey, Larry's drug dealer
 Dean Winters as Geoff, a neighbor who runs in the "wife carrying race"
 Ashley Spillers as Olivia, Mardy's lab assistant

Production
In July 2017, it was announced that David Spade, Nat Faxon, Bridgit Mendler, Joey Bragg, Matt Shively, and Jackie Sandler would star in Who Do You Think Would Win? for Netflix. The film was eventually re-titled Graduates and then later Father of the Year.

Principal photography took place in Boston and Hudson (a suburb just under an hour from Boston) in June 2017. Additional footage was gathered during multiple days of filming at Brandeis University in Waltham, Massachusetts.

Release
The film was released on July 20, 2018. It had previously been scheduled for release on June 29, 2018.

Reception

References

External links
 

American comedy films
2018 comedy films
English-language Netflix original films
Happy Madison Productions films
2010s English-language films
2018 films
Films produced by Allen Covert
2010s American films